Mallikarjun is an Indian playback singer and composer who mostly sings in Telugu, Tamil and Kannada language films. After emerging as one of the semi-finalists in the first edition of singing competition Padutha Theeyaga, he went on to become a playback singer in the South Indian film industry. He is married to playback singer Gopika Poornima. He is very well known as an energetic stage performer and ardent fan of Telugu actor Chiranjeevi.

Personal life 

Mallikarjun's father is an engineer in the Andhra Pradesh Irrigation department. He originally hails from Anakapalle of Visakhapatnam district. Mallikarjun was born when his father got transferred to Srisailam, a temple town. He was named after the local god Lord Mallikarjuna of Srisailam temple. His mother is a housewife. He has started learning music at the age of 9 and got recognition by padutha teeyaga musical competition. He has one sister.

He met his co-singer Gopika Poornima and fell in love with each other and got married on 10 February 2008 in Simhachalam. They have one daughter named Samhitha. Currently they are living in Chennai.

Career 
Mallikarjun made his debut as a playback singer along with Gopika Poornima in Chennai for the movie Singanna on 23 February 1997 composed by Vandemataram Srinivas. He has sung more than 300 songs in films and 2000 private devotional albums. He also assisted renowned music composers like Koti for 1 year and Mani Sharma for 8 years. He has the prospect of singing for all the heroes in Telugu Film Industry. He made his debut as a Composer for the movie Kathi Kantha Rao in 2010. He is one of the core singer in the musical band "SUSWANA" along with Gopika Poornima and Parthu formed in 2016 and performed in countries like India (Visakhapatnam, Chennai, Tirupati, Hospet), United States (Dallas, Texas), Kuwait And Oman (Muscat).Mallikarjun regularly sings in Swarabhishekam program telecast in ETV on every Sunday.

Awards 
He got the Nandi Award for Best Male Playback Singer in 2003 for the serial Sukhadukhalu (ETV) in the TV Section .

Concerts 
Mallikarjun has done more than 200 shows across the world. He also participated in various musical concerts in the countries like United States of America, United Kingdom(England, Ireland, Scotland), Australia, New Zealand, Africa (South Africa, Kenya, Tanzania), (Germany), Canada, Malaysia, Singapore, Japan, Arab World (Kuwait, Dubai, Saudi Arabia, Oman, Qatar, Bahrain) with legendary singers like Padmabhushan S. P. Balasubrahmanyam, S. P. Sailaja and others.

Performances 
Music concerts for TANA (Telugu Association of North America) in 2007 and 2013 along with famous music composer Mani Sharma.
 Music concerts for ATA (American Telugu Association) in 2006 and 2008 along with renowned music composers Mani Sharma and Devi Sri Prasad.
Music concerts for NATA (North America Telugu Association) in 2014.
Music concerts for TCAGT (Telugu Cultural Association of Greater Toronto) in Canada 2014 along with prominent music composer S. Thaman.
Performed at WTF (World Telugu Federation) in Singapore and Dubai in 2002 and 2006 along with eminent music composer R. P. Patnaik.
Performed extensively with renowned S. P. Balasubrahmanyam and G. Anand team across the world.
Performed at TAL (Telugu Association of London) in England 2017.
Performed at MATA (Mana Telugu Association) in Germany 2016.
Performed at SATC-South African Telugu Community's Musical Concert in South Africa 4 November 2018 and 8 February 2020

TV programmes 
 Participated as a judge and team leader in the musical competition "Airtel Super Singer 9" conducted by Star Maa in 2015.
 Participated as a judge in the musical competitions like "STAR OF AP" and "STAR SINGER" conducted by Gemini TV and Vissa TV.

Discography

Composer

Songs

References

External links 

Telugu playback singers
1976 births
Living people